Ferran Solé Sala (born 25 August 1992) is a Spanish handball player for Paris Saint-Germain and the Spanish national team.

He participated at the 2018 European Men's Handball Championship.

Individual awards
All-Star Right wing of the World Championship: 2021

References

External links

1992 births
Living people
Spanish male handball players
Expatriate handball players
Spanish expatriate sportspeople in France
Liga ASOBAL players
BM Granollers players
Handball players from Catalonia
People from Vallès Occidental
Sportspeople from the Province of Barcelona
Handball players at the 2020 Summer Olympics
Medalists at the 2020 Summer Olympics
Olympic bronze medalists for Spain
Olympic medalists in handball
21st-century Spanish people